In finance, a share class or share classification are different types of shares in company share capital that have different levels of voting rights. For example, a company might create two classes of shares class A share and a class B share where the class A shares have fewer rights than class B shareholders. This may be done to maintain control of a company by a group of shareholders or to make a company more difficult to take over.

For example, a company may create preferred stock as a poison pill that so that all Shareholder of common stock cannot agree to a merger or takeover plan.

There is no statutory procedure for converting shares from one class to another. It may be done with the consent of all the shareholders affected. The safest course is to pass a resolution to which all the shareholders consent because, in practice, changing the rights on one person's shares may well have an effect, at least in practice on the rights of all the other shareholders.

Classes
Companies can have the following classes:
 Ordinary shares
 Preference shares
 Non-voting stock
 Redeemable shares
 Convertible shares
 Deferred shares

See also
 Partly paid
 Phantom stock
 Restricted stock
 Shareholder
 Stock option

References

Equity securities